Peter Jansen may refer to:

 Peter Jansen (art educator) (born 1938), Dutch artist
 Peter Jansen (politician) (1852–1923), American sheep rancher and Nebraska state representative and senator
 Peter Jansen (rower), former New Zealand rower